Rich People is a 1929 pre-Code talking picture directed by Edward H. Griffith and starring Constance Bennett. It was produced by Ralph Block and distributed through Pathé Exchange.  It is based on a story by Jay Gelzer that was serialized from March to July 1928 in Good Housekeeping magazine.

Cast
Constance Bennett as Connie Hayden
Regis Toomey as Jef MacLean
Robert Ames as Noel Nevins
Mahlon Hamilton as Beverly Hayden
Ilka Chase as Margery Mears
John Loder as Captain Danforth
Polly Ann Young as Sally Vanderwater

Preservation
A print is preserved in the Library of Congress film collection.

References

External links

1929 films
Films directed by Edward H. Griffith
Films based on short fiction
1929 romantic drama films
American romantic drama films
American black-and-white films
Pathé Exchange films
1920s English-language films
1920s American films
Silent romantic drama films